Stiffy may refer to something that is hard, firm or rigid. It may also refer to:

 Stiffy (film), a 2005 short film by Jacqueline Wright
 Stiffy disk, an alternative name for the -inch floppy disk
 Graham Johncock (born 1982), Australian rules footballer
 A slang term for the word erection
 An award given at the Seattle's True Independent Film Festival
 A character in the early 20th-century "Stiffy and Mo" comedy duo; see Roy Rene
 Stiffy and Mo, a comic series by Alexander George Gurney, based on the radio comedy
 Stephanie "Stiffy" Byng, a character from P. G. Wodehouse's Jeeves stories
 Adolphus "Stiffy" Stiffham, a character from the P. G. Wodehouse story "The Luck of the Stiffhams"